Schloss Schönbühel is a castle in the Lower Austrian town of  Schönbühel-Aggsbach, below Melk on the right bank of the Danube. The origins of the castle date from the early 12th century.

History 
A Roman fortress may have stood there before. The castle was begun in the early 12th century by Marchwardus de Schoenbuchele as a defensive fortress. When his descendant Ulrich von Schonpihel died at the beginning of the 14th century, the family was extinguished. The castle was briefly owned by Conrad von Eisenbeutel, and then by the Abbey of Melk. In 1396 it was sold to the brothers Caspar and Gundaker von Starhemberg. It remained in the Starhemberg family for more than 400 years, but fell into disrepair.

In 1819 Prince Ludwig Josef von Starhemberg sold it, together with the castle of Aggstein, to Count Franz von Beroldingen, who had it renovated and partially rebuilt, so that by 1821 it was again habitable.

In 1930 the Schönbühel estate was sold to Count Oswald von Seilern und Aspang.

References

Further reading 
 Falko Daim, Karin Kühtreiber, Thomas Kühtreiber (2009) Burgen – Waldviertel, Wachau, Mährisches Thayatal, 2nd edition. Vienna: Freytag & Berndt, pages 468–471. (in German)

External links 

History of the castle (in German) on the website of the town of Schönbühel-Aggsbach

Castles in Lower Austria